Cornice Mountain, 2339 m (7674 feet), is a mountain in the Cambria Icefield of the Boundary Ranges of the northern Coast Mountains in British Columbia, Canada.  The peak is on the north flank of the Cambria Icefield, south of Strohn Creek and between Meziadin Lake and the Bear River Pass, northeast of the town of Stewart.

See also
Cornice Mountain (Stikine Icecap)
Cornice Ridge

References

Boundary Ranges
Stewart Country
Two-thousanders of British Columbia